Murwillumbah High School, (abbreviated as MHS) is a government-funded co-educational comprehensive secondary day school, located on Riverview Street in Murwillumbah, in the Northern Rivers region of New South Wales, Australia.

Established in 1929, the school enrolled approximately 440 students in 2018, from Year 7 to Year 12, of whom nine percent identified as Indigenous Australians and six percent were from a language background other than English. The school is operated by the NSW Department of Education; the principal is Peter Howes.

History and campus

1924  
After much deliberation and discussion, the Department has resumed an area of about eight acres on Hartigan’s Hill as the site for the new High School. Every day the optimists make a trip to the site to see what progress has been made with buildings, but, so far, the Department has not seen fit to make any use of the newly acquired site.

1928 
The foundation stone of the new High School buildings was laid on March 17 in the presence of a large gathering of parents and students. An untimely thunderstorm just failed to mar the proceedings, for when the Minister of Education inspected the Guard of Honour, comprising Girl Guides and Boy Scouts, the sun had just broken through.

Murwillumbah High School was made a "full" high school in 1929 and moved into its current site in that year with the opening of a three-storey complex which has become a well-known landmark in Murwillumbah.

Since 1929 many buildings have been added with major development beginning in the 1960s. In 1992 a new Library was opened and in mid-1997 the Multi-Purpose Centre/Hall was opened and dedicated as "The Elliott Centre", after a previous Principal of the school, Joe Elliott.

The school is built on the side of a hill, creating several floor levels across the school. Construction began in 1969 and continued over the following 3 years, culminating in a school that would meet the needs of the years to come. During this time the school's librarian and careers advisor Bruce Chick initiated the planting of a large Hoop Pine forest on the southern edge of the school. It was planted in 1970 as a Cook Bicentennial project. Students from the school were given the opportunity to plant a tree as a part of the commemoration. The original intention was to sell the timber from the plantation when the trees had reached maturity. The leadership of the school during these years fell to Joe Elliot and Bill Dowdell. The latter, in particular, is remembered with great affection by former students.

Captain James Cook had sighted, mapped and named Mount Warning in the Murwillumbah area as he sailed up the coast in 1770 and the fortnightly school newsletter ‘Endeavour’, is named in honour of his ship.

Development became the focus of attention during the early 1990s, when the school population peaked at 1,300 before the opening of Wollumbin High School, which then relaxed school capacity numbers.

Symbols
The official school colours are navy blue and white. However, over the years other colours were adopted (e.g. grey).

The first school magazine (yearbook) was published in December 1923 when the Murwillumbah Secondary School was a district school i.e. one that incorporated primary and infants departments. 

The school magazine was quickly named The Parnassian and has been published every year since it first appeared, copies of which are held in the school library.

Notable alumni 

 Doug Anthonyformer Deputy Prime Minister
 Rory ArnoldAustralian rugby union player for the Brumbies
 Jack Boydformer politician; represented Byron (1973–1984)
 Bob Bugden Australian rugby league footballer for the St. George Dragons
 Paul Cowderoycountry music artist
 Robert Haganinternational impressionist artist, author, and TV personality
 Ronald McKayEmeritus Professor, Vice Chancellor of the Northern Territory University (1996 - 2002)
 Stanley Stephenspolitician; represented Byron (1944–1973) and Minister for Housing in the Askin Government
 Bronwen Whitley (Pratley)USA Today bestselling fiction author
 Sir Eric WillisCabinet Minister from 1965 to 1976 and 34th Premier of New South Wales
 Max Willispolitician; served in the New South Wales Legislative Council (1970–1999) and as President of the Council (1991–1999)
 Edwin Wilsonpoet and painter; fifth form only, as recorded in 'The Mullumbimby Kid'
 Alan Woodsinternational professional punter (pioneer of computer betting syndicates) - the Alan Woods rating system (AWRS) adopted by Bridge clubs throughout Australia.

See also

 List of government schools in New South Wales
 List of schools in Northern Rivers and Mid North Coast
 Education in Australia

References

External links 
 
 New South Wales Department of Education and Training - Murwillumbah High School
 NSW Schools website

Public high schools in New South Wales
1929 establishments in Australia
Educational institutions established in 1929
Northern Rivers